Emile Guebehi (1937–2008) was a Ivoirian sculptor.

Her work is included in the collection of the Museum of Fine Arts Houston.

References

1937 births
2008 deaths
Ivorian artists